Events from 2020 in French Polynesia.

Incumbents 

 President: Édouard Fritch
 President of the Assembly: Gaston Tong Sang

Events 
Ongoing – COVID-19 pandemic in French Polynesia

 11 March – The first case of COVID-19 in the territory was confirmed. The first patient was Maina Sage, a member of the French National Assembly.
 4 April – A ban on sales of alcohol was extended until the pandemic was over.

Deaths

References 

2020 in French Polynesia
2020s in French Polynesia
Years of the 21st century in French Polynesia
French Polynesia